Acheson Best Overend (15 October 1909 – 1977) was an Australian architect. He is best known for the Cairo Flats in Fitzroy, built 1935-6, a daringly Modernist design for Melbourne in the 1930s.

Early life 
Best Overend was born in Launceston, Tasmania on 15 October 1909. He was the son of Harold Acheson Overend, a Methodist minister and Emily Trahair, a businesswoman, and was educated at Wesley College, Melbourne.

In 1926 he became an articled pupil in the practice of architect H. Vivian Taylor, who was an expert in acoustics and specialized in the design of theatres and broadcasting stations.  During this time, he worked on the additions of Station 2AY Broadcasting Studio in Albury, 1930, the remodelling of the Crown theatre for HO Peterson Esq.

Overend was educated in architecture at Swinburne Technical College and later attended the evening classes at the University of Melbourne Architectural Atelier.

Career 
Overend went to London in 1931, where he first worked for Raymond McGrath, a fellow Australian who was then working on the interiors of the BBC's Broadcasting House. Overend soon left in July 1931 to work for ‘Wonderful Wells’ (Wells Coates).

He worked under Wells Coates as chief draftsman for over eighteen months when the office was developing the Isokon Flats. 

In September 1931 he received a job offer from Serge Chermayeff (whose office adjoined McGrath’s) to do the drawings and calculations for a house which he designed on his own. Wells later rejected the offer on behalf for Overend as he refused to let Overend work under Chermayeff as his subordinate.

Overend passed his RIBA examinations in 1932 and joined the Architectural Association.

Practice in Melbourne 
Overend returned to Melbourne in March 1933. He was then offered a partnership with H. Vivian Taylor and G. A. Soilleux, architects of 499 Little Collins Street in May. It was only shortly after he was elected as an Associate of the RVIA. The firm later known as 'Messrs H. Vivian Taylor, Soilleux and Overend' specialized in cinema design. Important examples included the Windsor Theatre, Albert Street, Windsor, 1936 and the Padua Theatre, Brunswick in 1937, both now demolished, with only the Rivoli Theatre in East Hawthorn still standing. Other commissions include service stations in Carlton and in Flinders Street at Queens Bridge in 1933. 

While working at Taylor & Soilleux he designed Cairo Flats on his won in 1935-6, the design for which he is best known. 

In 1937 he left the partnership to travel overseas again, sailing for Japan, but was diverted to Shanghai, where he found work with Lester Johnson & Morris, and worked on the design of an ultra-modern skyscraper for the Bund waterfront. The project was halted with the Japanese bombardment of the city in September which Overend reported on extensively for the Australian press.

In May 1938, Overend opened his own firm and his projects were mainly residential before World War II began. 

Between 1938 and 1955 Overend was appointed to the Housing Commission of the Victorian Architect's Panel where he advocated prefabricated housing solutions. He has been credited with the design for the Gippsland 'new town' of Churchill, announced in 1965.

Achievements 
 Published in The Argus
 Published in the Home Beautiful, an art magazine from Geelong entitled Manuscripts
 Published in Table Talk
 Awarded Prize-Winning Nursery Design in 1930
 Writer for the column, "Architecture and Property" in The Argus
 One of four architects on the Architects Panel of the Housing Commission of Victoria from 1938 to 1955

Military service 
Overend served in the Royal Australian Air Force in World War II. He rose to the rank of Squadron Leader and was mentioned in dispatches.

Notable works

Armytage House 
One of Overend's first works in this partnership was the design of the Armytage House, Mont Albert Road, Balwyn, 1933. An article in the Australian Home Beautiful talked about the simplicity of materials, and how this principle determined the form and finish of this house both internally and externally . The sweeping concrete stair ' apparently unsupported' and expressed on exterior by a curved corner tower, was a notable feature of the design. The house was demolished in 1980.

Cairo Flats 

In December 1935, Overend was asked to design a block of 40 flats in Nicholson Street, Fitzroy. He proposed 28 apartments, mainly studio flats with a single main room, as well as some with a separate bedroom. The development included a shops, a communal dining room, storage rooms, and an apartment for a manager. They were planned as a U-shaped block around a garden, with two main long wings facing north with small balconies and large window-walls allowing maximum sun penetration. The building was completed in December 1936.

Koornong School 
Overend designed the school at Warrandyte, Victoria in 1939. He used exposed framing with stained boards and paintings from the teachers. Most of the schools' buildings were destroyed by bushfires in the 1950s.

House in North Balwyn 
Another of Overends' projects for a house was built on a hillside in 1939. It is located in North Balwyn. The house was 2 stories high, and is a rectangular prism. It is made from brick, cement sheets, steel, and timbers. Each area inside was separated by a sliding curtain.

References 

 

1909 births
1977 deaths
People from Launceston, Tasmania
20th-century Australian architects